The Cimarrones de Sonora Fútbol Club is a Mexican football club that plays in the Liga de Expansión MX. The club is based in Hermosillo, Sonora, Mexico.

History
The "Cimarrones de Sonora" were born in 2013, when the "Rays" of Poblado Miguel Alemán FC became the champions of the Third Division of Mexico and thus were promoted to Second División 2. After the ascent, with the goal of reaching the Liga de Ascenso of Mexico, employers and trustees of Hermosillo origin, led by Edmundo Ruiz, acquired the franchise as a whole, since this had an agreement with the Necaxa.
After this happens, the Mexican Football Federation will communicate to employers that the franchise did not have approval to participate in the precinct Miguel Aleman, since it lacked the minimum infrastructure requirements, hospitality, transportation, etc. That's when managers decided to move the franchise to Hermosillo, renaming the club to "Maroons of Sonora" and having as coach Enrique Ferreira.
That was how the team played its first game in the second division at the Águilas Reales de Zacatecas, which ended with the score tied at 0–0. On August 30 they recorded their first victory by defeating 2–1 the Vaqueros de Ameca. As a result of this first tournament, the Apertura 2013, the team finished in 17th position in the overall standings. The next tournament ended again in with the Cimarrones in the 17th position.
In the 2014 Apertura tournament with Angel Monares as coach, the team improved significantly. He finished top of Group 1 of the Premier League and fourth place overall in the second division. Maroons played the final against the Potros UAEM. In the first leg 1–0 Maroons emerged victorious Estadio Hector Espino at full capacity, however, in the second leg they beat the Potros UAEM in Estadio Alberto "Chivo" Córdoba by a score of 2–0 in overtime, finishing as runners-up of the tournament.
In the Clausura 2015 another coaching change was made,  and Jorge Humberto Torres was hired. The team finished in fourth place in the overall standings and were eliminated in the semi-finals by Loros de la Universidad de Colima.

Liga de Ascenso
The May 29, 2015, after announcing the expansion of the Liga de Ascenso, it was announced that the team would be promoted, beginning with the Clausura 2015 season, to the league. This marked the highest the Maroons had reached on the Mexican pyramid. The team has since made the quarterfinals of the Ascenso three times, never advancing beyond this round.

Stadium

Cimarrones de Sonora play their home matches at the Estadio Héroe de Nacozari in Hermosillo, Sonora. The stadium capacity is 18,747 people. Its surface is covered by natural grass. The stadium was opened in 1985.

Season to season

Personnel

Coaching staff

Players

First-team squad

Out on loan

Reserve teams
Cimarrones de Sonora Premier
Reserve team that plays in the Liga Premier in the third level of the Mexican league system.

Cimarrones de Sonora (Liga TDP)
Reserve team that plays in the Liga TDP, the fourth level of the Mexican league system.

Managers
  Enrique Ferreira (2013)
  Ángel Monares (2013–14)
  Jorge Humberto Torres (2015)
  Javier López (interim) (2015)
  Héctor Medrano (2016)
  Juan Carlos Chávez (2016–2017)
  Mario García Covalles (2017–2018)
  Héctor Altamirano (2018)
  Isaac Morales Domínguez (2019–2020)
  Gabriel Pereyra (2020–2022)
  Roberto Hernández (2022–)

See also
Football in Mexico

References

Football clubs in Sonora
Association football clubs established in 2013
2013 establishments in Mexico
Ascenso MX teams